Bedene is a Slovenian surname. Notable people with the surname include:

Aljaž Bedene (born 1989), Slovenian tennis player
Andraž Bedene (born 1989), Slovenian tennis player, twin brother of Aljaž

Slovene-language surnames